Santiago de Chocorvos District is one of the sixteen districts of the Huaytará province in Peru.

Geography 
Other mountains are listed below:

References